Auto is a village in the east of Tutuila Island, American Samoa. It is located at the western end of Faga'itua Bay, immediately east of Alega.

It is home to ancient burial sites.

Demographics

See also
Amaua and Auto Village Marine Protected Area

References

Villages in American Samoa
Tutuila

}